Grabo is a town in south-western Ivory Coast. It is a sub-prefecture and commune of Tabou Department in San-Pédro Region, Bas-Sassandra District. The town is three kilometres east of the Cavally River, which forms the border with Liberia.

In 2014, the population of the sub-prefecture of Grabo was 39,181.

Villages
The nineteen villages of the sub-prefecture of Grabo and their population in 2014 are:

References

Sub-prefectures of San-Pédro Region
Communes of San-Pédro Region